Project 13 was the second EP by the rock band Cold. It was released in 2000.

Track listing

Personnel
Scooter Ward - vocals, rhythm guitar, piano, keyboards
Kelly Hayes - lead guitar
Jeremy Marshall - bass
Sam McCandless - drums

External links
 [ Allmusic database entry]

2000 EPs
Cold (band) EPs